Liberation Day is the National Day of the Falkland Islands and commemorates the liberation of the Falkland Islanders from Argentine military occupation at the end of the Falklands War on 14 June 1982.

It is celebrated every year on 14 June (observed on 15 June when 14th is a Sunday) and is a public holiday. Commemorations include a thanksgiving service at Christ Church Cathedral, followed by wreath laying at the Liberation Memorial and a military parade in Stanley.

See also
 Falklands Day

References

Annual events in the Falkland Islands
June observances
Falkland Islands
Falkland Islands culture